Chung Li-ho ( (pinyin Zhong Lihe), Hakka transliteration: Chûng Lî-fò or Tsûng Li-fô) December 15, 1915 – August 4, 1960, was a writer from Taiwan famous mainly for fiction. He was a Liudui Hakka, born in Gaoshu Township, Pingtung in 1915, who moved with his parents to a newly purchased fruit and coffee plantation in Meinong in around 1932. Eloping with a woman because their same-surname relationship was taboo in their community, he resided in Japanese-occupied China - Shenyang and Beijing -between 1938 and 1946. He died of pulmonary tuberculosis at the age of 44 in Meinong whilst revising his last and possibly finest work, a novella entitled "Rain".

Legacy 
There is a Chung Li-ho Museum, located in Meinong, Kaohsiung is dedicated to Chung. His life has been dramatized as China, My Native Land, a 1980 film directed by Li Hsing, featuring theme and other songs by Teresa Teng. Chung's eldest son, was an award-winning writer of fiction and prose. The asteroid 237187 Zhonglihe, discovered by Xiangyao Hsiao and Ye Quan-Zhi at Lulin Observatory in 2008, was named in his memory. The official  was published by the Minor Planet Center on 12 October 2011.

See also 
 Chung Li-ho Museum

References 
 

T. M. McClellan, “Home and the Land: the “native” fiction of Zhong Lihe”, Journal of Modern Literature in Chinese, 9.2 (December 2009): 154-182.

Zhong Lihe, From the Old Country: stories and sketches of China and Taiwan, Edited and translated by T. M. McClellan, Columbia University Press, 2014.

External links 
 
 Digital museum of Chung Li-ho - a website and database built by the Taiwan government 

Taiwanese male novelists
Taiwanese people of Hakka descent
People from Meixian District
People from Pingtung County
20th-century deaths from tuberculosis
1960 deaths
1915 births
20th-century novelists
Tuberculosis deaths in Taiwan
20th-century male writers